The 1984–85 season was the 86th season for FC Barcelona.

Squad

Competitions

La Liga

League table

Results summary

Result round by round

Matches

Copa de la Liga

Second round

Quarterfinals

European Cup Winners' Cup

First round

Copa del Rey

Second round

Third round

Fourth round

Eighthfinals

Quarterfinals

Friendlies

Ciutat de Palma Trophy

Joan Gamper Trophy

Ramón de Carranza Trophy

Other friendlies
06-08-1984 Friendly ANDORRA-BARCELONA 0-5

References

External links

webdelcule.com

FC Barcelona seasons
Spanish football championship-winning seasons
Barcelona